Angus McKay, MacKay or Mackay may refer to:

Politicians
 Angus Mackay (Victorian politician) (1824–1866), member of the Victorian Legislative Assembly
 Angus Mackay (Queensland politician) (1834–1910), member of the Queensland Legislative Assembly
 Angus McKay (Manitoba politician) (1836–1910), Canadian politician; first aboriginal Canadian elected to the Canadian House of Commons
 Angus McKay (Ontario politician) (1852–1916), physician and politician in Ontario, Canada
 Angus MacKay (Scottish politician) (born 1964), Member of the Scottish Parliament

Others
 Angus Mackay, 6th of Strathnaver (died 1403)
 Angus MacKay (actor) (1926–2013), British actor
 Angus McKay, a minor character in the BBC Scottish TV drama Monarch of the Glen
 Gus Mackay (Angus, born 1967), Zimbabwean cricketer
 Angus Mackay (historian) (born 1939), Scottish historian
 Angus MacKay (piper) (1813–1859), Scottish bagpipe player
 Angus MacKay (1840–1931), superintendent of the Indian Head Experimental Farm
 Angus MacKay (racing driver) (born 1946), British former auto racing driver